Praeugenini is a tribe of darkling beetles in the family Tenebrionidae. There are about seven genera in Praeugenini, found in tropical Africa.

Genera
These genera belong to the tribe Praeugenini:
 Anarmostodera Fairmaire, 1897 
 Dysgena Mäklin, 1863
 Miltoprepes Gerstaecker, 1871
 Nesogena Mäklin, 1863
 Phaeostolus Fairmaire, 1884
 Praeugena Laporte, 1840
 Pseudopraeugena De Moor, 1970

References

Further reading

 
 

Tenebrionoidea